Huangling County is a county in the north of Shaanxi province, China, bordering Gansu province to the west. It is under the administration of the prefecture-level city of Yan'an.

Etymology 
The county is named after the Mausoleum of the Yellow Emperor.

Administrative divisions
Huangling County is divided into one subdistrict and five towns. The county government is located in Qiaoshan Subdistrict.

Geography 
Over 70% of the county is forested.

History 
Archeoligcal evidence from the ancient Yangshao culture indicates that the area of present-day Huangling County has been inhabited since the Neolithic age. In 221 BCE, the Qin Dynasty unified a number of small counties in the area under the Shang Commandery. The area was reorganized a number of times before being occupied by the Xiongnu in 189 CE. The area of present-day Huangling County would be re-organized a number of times under the Northern Zhou Dynasty, the Tang Dynasty, the Song Dynasty, the Ming Dynasty, and, ultimately, the Qing Dynasty. The area would fall under control of the People's Republic of China by May 1948. Named Huangling County since 1944, the jurisdiction has since underwent a number of restructurings, with its most recent being in 2015.

Economy 
In 2011, the county's GDP was 8.356 billion Renminbi, which the county government forecasted to increase to 11.86 billion by 2015. The county has an apple-growing area of 210,000 mu, producing an annual output of 270,000 tons of apples. Huangling County has proven coal reserves of 2.7 billion tons, with an annual output of 29 million tons of raw coal. The county also has petroleum reserves.

Historical sites
The Mausoleum of the Yellow Emperor, built to honor the legendary Yellow Emperor, is located within Huangling County. The complex's structures were built throughout various times in history, with the oldest portions of the mausoleum exceeding 2,000 years in age.

Transportation
China National Highway 210
G65 Baotou–Maoming Expressway
Xi'an–Yan'an Railway

References 

County-level divisions of Shaanxi
Yan'an